Atlantic Beach is a city in Duval County, Florida, United States and part of the Jacksonville Beaches communities. When the majority of communities in Duval County consolidated with Jacksonville in 1968, Atlantic Beach, along with Jacksonville Beach, Neptune Beach, and Baldwin, remained quasi-independent. Like the other towns, it maintains its own municipal government, but its residents vote in the Jacksonville mayoral election and have representation on the Jacksonville city council. The population was 12,655 at the 2010 census.

History

In 1900 Henry Flagler built the Mayport branch of the railroad and erected a station north of where the Adele Grage Cultural Center is currently located. Soon afterward Henry Flagler along with Isaac George built a large hotel called the Continental Hotel on the railroad line between Pablo Beach (Jacksonville Beach) and Mayport. The hotel was a summer resort with 250 guest rooms. There was also a dance pavilion, tennis courts, and a fishing pier. In 1913 the railroad sold most of the land to the Atlantic Beach Corporation which then began paving streets, installing lights, and water and sewer lines. In that same year the Continental Hotel changed its name to the Atlantic Beach Hotel. However, during World War I people were afraid to come to the coast and the Atlantic Beach Corporation went bankrupt. To make matters worse the Atlantic Beach Hotel burned down on September 20, 1919. After the war land began to sell again and the settlement grew. The Town of Atlantic Beach was incorporated in 1926 and the first charter was drafted by Isaac George and adopted in 1929. The first town hall burned down in 1932, so a new one was built later that year. The newly established Mayport Naval Station and the construction of the Mathews Bridge led to the further development of the town. The boundaries of Atlantic Beach were extended in 1987 with the annexation of Seminole Beach, and again in 1996 by extending the westerly boundary to the Intracoastal Waterway.

Geography

Transportation

Major highways

Demographics

As of the census of 2000, there were 13,368 people, 5,623 households, and 3,643 families residing in the city. The population density was 3,584.3 inhabitants per square mile (1,383.8/km2). The racial makeup of the city was 82.23% White, 12.69% African American, 0.26% Native American, 2.09% Asian, 0.03% Pacific Islander, 1.12% from other races, and 1.58% from two or more races. Hispanic or Latino of any race were 4.18% of the population.

There were 5,623 households, out of which 28.2% had children under the age of 18 living with them, 48.9% were married couples living together, 12.4% had a female householder with no husband present, and 35.2% were non-families. 26.5% of all households were made up of individuals, and 9.8% had someone living alone who was 65 years of age or older. The average household size was 2.36 and the average family size was 2.86.

In the city, the population was spread out, with 22.5% under the age of 18, 7.0% from 18 to 24, 30.9% from 25 to 44, 24.3% from 45 to 64, and 15.4% who were 65 years of age or older. The median age was 39 years. For every 100 females, there were 94.7 males. For every 100 females age 18 and over, there were 91.2 males.

The median income for a household in the city was $48,353, and the median income for a family was $53,854. Males had a median income of $37,438 versus $27,321 for females. The per capita income for the city was $28,618. About 5.7% of families and 8.8% of the population were below the poverty line, including 14.3% of those under age 18 and 5.8% of those age 65 or over.

Notable people

 Linden Ashby (born 1960), American actor and martial artist, known for his role in  MTV's Teen Wolf series (born in Atlantic Beach)
 Kyle Brady (born 1972), former professional American football player (Originally from Camp Hill, Pennsylvania, he is currently based and lives in Atlantic Beach)
 Carey Cavanaugh (born 1955), former U.S. Ambassador/peace mediator and currently professor of diplomacy at the University of Kentucky and chairman of International Alert (grew up in Atlantic Beach)
 Paula Coughlin (born 1962), former lieutenant and naval aviator in the United States Navy and whistleblower, known for her role in Tailhook scandal (currently resides in Atlantic Beach)
 Julie Nixon Eisenhower (born 1948), American author, younger daughter of Richard Nixon, 37th President of the United States, and Pat Nixon, First Lady of the United States and wife of David Eisenhower, grandson of Dwight D. Eisenhower, 34th President of the United States (resided in Atlantic Beach during five years between 1971 and 1975)
 Pat Frank (1908–1964), American writer, newspaperman, and government consultant (Originally from Chicago, Illinois, died in Atlantic Beach)
 Charles T. Meide (born 1971), American underwater and maritime archaeologist (born in Jacksonville, Florida, raised in Atlantic Beach)
 Caitlin Parrish, American playwright, television writer, and filmmaker, co-creator of CBS The Red Line (born and raised in Atlantic Beach, currently resides between Chicago, Illinois and Los Angeles, California)
Claire Rasmus (born 1996), American freestyle swimmer and four-time Pan American Games champion (Originally from Metairie, Louisiana, currently resides in Atlantic Beach)
 Willard J. Smith (1910–2000), 13th Commandant of the United States Coast Guard from 1966 to 1970 (Originally from Suttons Bay, Michigan, died in Atlantic Beach)
 Whitney Thompson (born 1987), American plus-size model and is the winner of the tenth cycle of America's Next Top Model (born in Atlantic Beach)
 Norvell G. Ward (1912–2005), American naval officer and a recipient of the Navy Cross (Originally from Indian Head, Maryland, died in Atlantic Beach)

See also
 Jacksonville Beaches
 Duval County, Florida
 Greater Jacksonville

References

External links

 
 

1926 establishments in Florida
Beaches of Duval County, Florida
Beaches of Florida
Cities in Duval County, Florida
Cities in Florida
Cities in the Jacksonville metropolitan area
Populated coastal places in Florida on the Atlantic Ocean
Populated places established in 1926
Port cities and towns of the Florida Atlantic coast